Nistowiak Falls, at , is one of the highest waterfalls in the province of Saskatchewan, Canada. The falls are on the Rapid River, which flows north from Iskwatikan Lake into Nistowiak Lake on the Churchill River. Nistowiak is a Cree word referring to the convergence of waters.

Access

The closest access is from the Stanley Mission Indian reserve #157, part of the La Ronge Indian Band. Stanley Mission is at the north end of Highway 915, which connects via Highway 102 to Highway 2 in La Ronge. The falls, Iskwatikan Lake and the south shore of Nistowiak Lake are within Lac La Ronge Provincial Park. There is a tourist fishing camp on the west side of the Rapid River at Nistowiak Lake called "Jim's Camp". Some minimal supplies can be obtained there. The trail to the falls goes through the fishing camp for part of the way. Lac la Ronge drains into the Churchill River through these falls.

Photos

References

External links
Canoeing on the Churchill River
Lac La Ronge Provincial Park

Waterfalls of Saskatchewan